is a Japanese actress, model, and gravure idol. Her best-known role was Usagi Tsukino/Sailor Moon in the live-action adaptation of Sailor Moon which ran from 2003 to 2004.

Personal life 
On October 22, 2022, Sawai announced that she is married with comedian Hiroyuki Takagishi.

Modeling career

Photobooks
 2002: Miyu - 
 2004: Kiss - 
 2005: Miyu - 
 2008: Present: Purezon - 
 2013: Hitotoki -

Idol DVDs 
 2002: Me
 2002: You
 2004: Kiss
 2005: South Wind
 2005: Perfect Collection
 2005: Me→You
 2006: Snow White
 2006: Fresh:Re:Fresh
 2008: Sawai Ryu

Digital photo and movie works
 2011: Colors: 3 ri no Sawai Miyu

Filmography

Television
Pretty Guardian Sailor Moon (2003–04), Usagi Tsukino
Kids Wars 5 (2005), Yoko Kimura
Kamen Rider Wizard (2013), Aya Yamamoto (episodes 47, 48, 51)
Kamen Rider Amazons (2016), Mika (episodes 9, 12)
Kamen Rider Ex-Aid (2017), Tōko Suzuki (episodes 42–44)
Kishiryu Sentai Ryusoulger (2019), Master Pink
The Sunflower Disappeared in the Rain (2022), Tae Asami

Film
A Chain of Cursed Murders (2005), Saki
Shaolin Girl (2008), Kanagawa Miyuu
Kamen Rider × Kamen Rider W & Decade: Movie War 2010 (2010), Erika Mutsuki
Space Battleship Yamato (2010), Higashida

Anime
Fullmetal Alchemist: Conqueror of Shamballa (2005), Noah
Black Cat (2006), Reira/Layla
GR: Giant Robo (2007), V

References

External links 
  
 
 

Japanese voice actresses
Japanese gravure idols
Japanese female models
1987 births
Living people